Jack Epps Jr. (born November 3, 1949) is an American screenwriter, author, and educator, known chiefly for such popular 1980s films as Top Gun, Legal Eagles, and The Secret of My Success, which he wrote with longtime partner Jim Cash. Epps Jr. graduated from the College of Arts and Letters at Michigan State University, and he has since gone on to teach at the University of Southern California.

Career
Epps Jr. came to California to become a director, but he did not have the money or know-how to do so. He decided to first write a script and to hope that this would lead to directing. Partnering with Anderson House, they sold a script to Hawaii Five-O. He continued to work with House for a few years, before partnering with Jim Cash.

Top Gun and later successes
After completing seven unproduced screenplays together, Epps Jr. and Cash produced Top Gun. This film went on to become the number-one worldwide box office hit in 1986. After this, they quickly wrote other screenplays that were produced, including Legal Eagles and The Secret of My Success. Epps has co-authored over 25 screenplays and eight motion pictures that he produced well into the following decade, including Turner & Hooch, Dick Tracy, and Anaconda. He wrote for some of the most successful actors in the industry including Tom Cruise, Robert Redford, Tom Hanks, Warren Beatty and others.

Teaching
Epps Jr. is an Associate Professor and Chair of the Writing for Screen and Television Division in the School of Cinematic Arts, at the University of Southern California. Using techniques he had developed over his career and applied to classes, he authored a screenwriting manual, Screenwriting is Rewriting: The Art and Craft of Professional Revision, in 2016.

Awards and honors
Epps Jr. was awarded on an honorary doctorate of fine arts by Michigan State University at their 2009 commencement. He is also the recipient of the Michigan State University Spartans in Hollywood Award. He is part of the Writers Guild of America where he has been a member for three decades and he is a member of the Academy of Motion Picture Arts and Sciences.

Filmography
Hawaii Five-O (1976) (TV)
Kojak (1976) (TV)
Dangerously (with Jim Cash) (1978) (unproduced)
Pigs vs. Freaks (with Gordon T. Dawson) (1984) (TV)
Izzy and Moe (with Jim Cash, Steven Patrick Bell and Robert Boris) (1985) (TV) (story only)
Top Gun (with Jim Cash) (1986)
Legal Eagles (with Jim Cash) (1986) 
The Secret of My Success (with Jim Cash and A.J. Carothers) (1987) 
Turner & Hooch (with Jim Cash, Dennis Shryack, Michael Blodgett, and Daniel Petrie Jr.) (1989)
Dick Tracy (with Jim Cash) (1990) 
Anaconda (with Jim Cash and Hans Bauer) (1997) (producer)
The Flintstones in Viva Rock Vegas (with Jim Cash, Deborah Kaplan and Harry Elfont) (2000)
Anacondas: The Hunt for the Blood Orchid (with Jim Cash and Hans Bauer) (2004) (story, elements from the original Anaconda script)
Top Gun: Maverick (based on characters created with Jim Cash) (2022) (story only) (screenplay from the film Top Gun)

References

External links

1949 births
Living people
20th-century male writers
University of Southern California faculty
Writers from Detroit
Writers of books about writing fiction
American information and reference writers
American instructional writers
American male non-fiction writers
American male screenwriters
Screenwriters from California
Screenwriting instructors
Film producers from Michigan
Screenwriters from Michigan